The 2010 Sun Life Financial Invitational Curling Classic was held November 19–22 at the Brantford Golf and Country Club and Brant Curling Club in Brantford, Ontario and the Paris Curling Club in Paris, Ontario. It was held on Week 11 of the 2010-11 World Curling Tour season. The total purse for both the men's and women's events was CAD$50,000.

Men's

Teams
 Greg Balsdon
 Jonathan Beuk
 Mark Bice
 Peter Corner
 John Epping
 Pete Fenson
 Martin Ferland
 Darcy Garbedian
 Tyler George
 Gerry Geurts
 Brad Gushue
 Mike Harris
 Jake Higgs
 Glenn Howard
 Brad Jacobs
 Mike Jakubo
 Mark Kean
 Rob Lobel
 Dale Matchett
 Heath McCormick
 Mike McEwen
 Jean-Michel Ménard
 Wayne Middaugh
 Matt Paul
 Howard Rajala
 Nick Rizzo
 Brendan Taylor
 Wayne Tuck, Jr.

Playoffs

Women's

Teams
 Cathy Auld
 Denna Bagshaw
 Ève Bélisle
 Suzanne Birt
 Erika Brown
 Kathy Brown
 Chrissy Cadorin
 Alison Goring
 Jacqueline Harrison
 Julie Hastings
 Amber Holland
 Rachel Homan
 Tracy Horgan
 Jennifer Jones
 Patti Lank
 Marie-France Larouche
 Carrie Lindner
 Colleen Madonia
 Lauren Mann
 Heather Marshall
 Krista McCarville
 Sherry Middaugh
 Shelley Nichols
 Brit O'Neill
 Cathy Overton-Clapham
 Allison Pottinger
 Brette Richards
 Kelly Scott
 Robyn Silvernagle
 Heather Strong
 Kirsten Wall

Playoffs

External links
 Official site

Sun Life Classic, 2010
Sport in Brantford
Curling in Ontario